Tim Cunningham is an American actor.

Tim Cunningham may also refer to:

 Tim Cunningham (Shortland Street), a fictional character of soap opera Shortland Street
 Tim Cunningham, writer of the film The Big I Am
 Tim Cunningham (British actor), actor from the film Small Time